Mishqah Parthiephal (born 21 September 1989) is a South African actress, model and filmmaker. After her first film role in 2010, she primarily worked in television and advertising until 2015. Outside South Africa, she is best known for her role as the lawyer Priya Seghal in the CTV/Netflix series The Indian Detective.

Early life
Born and raised in Verulam, just north of Durban, Parthiepal is Muslim of Indian descent on her father's side and Malay on her mother's. She attended Durban Girls' High School. She studied drama and media at the University of KwaZulu-Natal before moving to Johannesburg.

Filmography

Film

Television

References

External links
 
 
 

Living people
1989 births
21st-century South African actresses
Actors from Durban
South African people of Indian descent
South African people of Malay descent
South African Muslims
University of KwaZulu-Natal alumni
Alumni of Durban Girls' High School